Bill Tilden defeated Zenzo Shimizu 6–4, 6–4, 13–11 in the All Comers' Final, and then defeated the reigning champion Gerald Patterson 2–6, 6–3, 6–2, 6–4 in the challenge round to win the gentlemen's singles tennis title at the 1920 Wimbledon Championships.

Draw

Challenge round

All-Comers' Finals

Top half

Section 1

Section 2

Section 3

Section 4

Bottom half

Section 5

Section 6

Section 7

Section 8

References

External links

Men's Singles
Wimbledon Championship by year – Men's singles